is a Japanese multinational corporation headquartered in Ōta, Tokyo, Japan, specializing in optical, imaging, and industrial products, such as lenses, cameras, medical equipment, scanners, printers, and semiconductor manufacturing equipment.

Canon has a primary listing on the Tokyo Stock Exchange and is a constituent of the TOPIX Core 30 and Nikkei 225 indexes. It used to have a secondary listing on the New York Stock Exchange.

Name
The company was originally named Seikikōgaku kenkyūsho (Jpn. , Precision Optical Industry Co. Ltd.). In 1934 it produced the Kwanon, a prototype for Japan's first-ever 35 mm camera with a focal-plane-based shutter. In 1947 the company name was changed to Canon Camera Co., Inc., shortened to Canon Inc. in 1969. The name Canon comes from Buddhist bodhisattva , previously transliterated as Kuanyin, Kwannon, or Kwanon in English.

History

1933–1970
The origins of Canon date back to the founding of Precision Optical Instruments Laboratory in Japan in 1933 by Takeshi Mitarai, Goro Yoshida, Saburo Uchida and Takeo Maeda. It became the company Precision Optical Instruments, Co., Ltd. in 1937. During its early years, the company did not have any facilities to produce its own optical glass, and its first cameras incorporated Nikkor lenses from Nippon Kogaku K.K. (the later Nikon Corporation).

Between 1933 and 1936, 'The Kwanon', a copy of the Leica design, Japan's first 35 mm focal-plane-shutter camera, was developed in prototype form. In 1940 Canon developed Japan's first indirect X-ray camera. Canon introduced a field zoom lens for television broadcasting in 1958, and in 1959 introduced the Reflex Zoom 8 and the Canonflex.

In 1961, Canon introduced the Rangefinder camera, Canon 7, and 50mm 1:0.95 lens in a special bayonet mount. In 1964 Canon introduced the 'Canola 130', the first Japanese made 10-key calculator, a substantial improvement on the design of the British Bell Punch company, which introduced the first fully electronic calculator two years earlier with the Sumlock Anita Mark 8 unit. In 1965 Canon introduced the Canon Pellix, a single lens reflex (SLR) camera with a semi-transparent stationary mirror which enabled the taking of pictures through the mirror.

1970–2009 
In 1971, Canon introduced the Canon F-1, a high-end SLR camera, and the FD lens range. In 1976, Canon launched the Canon AE-1, the world's first camera with an embedded micro-computer.

Canon introduced their Inkjet printer using bubble-jet technology in 1985, one year after Hewlett-Packard.  In 1987, Canon introduced their Canon Electro-Optical System (EOS), named after the goddess of the dawn, along with the Canon EOS 650 autofocus SLR camera. Also in 1987, the Canon Foundation was established. In 1988, Canon introduced 'Kyosei philosophy'. The EOS 1 Flagship Professional SLR line was launched in 1989. In the same year the EOS RT, the world's first AF SLR with a fixed, semi-transparent pellicle mirror, was unveiled.

In 1992, Canon launched the Canon EOS 5, the first-ever camera with eye-controlled AF, and the PowerShot 600, its first digital camera. In 1995, Canon introduced the first commercially available SLR lens with internal image stabilization, Canon EF 75-300mm lens f/4-5.6 IS USM.  The Canon EOS-RS was the world's fastest AF SLR camera with a continuous shooting speed of 10 frame/s at the time. Based on the EOS-1N, the EOS-1N RS had a fixed, semi-transparent pellicle mirror with a hard coat. In 1996, Canon introduced a pocket-sized digital camera with the Advanced Photo System, named ELPH in America and IXUS in Europe. Canon entered the digital video camcorder market in 1997.

In 2004, Canon introduced the XEED SX50 LCD projector. Canon introduced its first high-definition camcorder in 2005.

In November 2009, Canon made a €730 million (US$1.1 billion) all-cash offer for the Dutch printer maker Océ. Canon had acquired majority ownership of Océ by March 2010, and completed the acquisition of 100% of shares in Océ by the end of 2011.

2010–2020 
In 2010, Canon acquired Tereck Office Solutions, Inc.

On 16 March 2010, Canon announced that it was seeking to acquire a new  generic top-level domain, acquiring it in February 2015 and using it for the first time on its global website in May 2016.

In the third quarter of 2012, Canon's global market share in the sale of printers, copiers and multifunction devices was 20.90%.

In early 2013, Canon USA moved into a new US$500 million headquarters in Melville, New York.

In February 2014, Canon announced it would acquire Texas-based Molecular Imprints Inc., a developer of nanoprint lithography systems, for an amount speculated to be around US$98 million.

On 13 June 2014, Canon announced it had acquired Danish IP Surveillance VMS software company Milestone Systems. Milestone provides open-platform software to allow video management from various vendors in a single interface; therefore the company will operate as a separate entity.

On 10 February 2015, Canon announced that it had intentions to buy Swedish Security Camera maker Axis Communications for US$2.83 billion. On 23 February 2015, Axis Communications reacted to this news and confirmed that it had received a purchase proposal from Canon. The purchase was effectively completed in April 2015.

On 24 April 2015, Canon Europe announced it had acquired the London-based family photo sharing startup Lifecake.

In November 2015, in an effort to avoid the selling of gray-market camera gear, Canon USA filed litigation against a number of camera gear retailers. Retailers include Get It Digital, All New Shop and F&E Trading.

In March 2016, Canon acquired Toshiba Medical Systems Corporation for US$5.9 billion.

On 28 March 2017, Canon Europe announced it had acquired the London-based printing startup Kite.

On 2 April 2019, Canon introduces two new UHDgc 2/3-inch Portable Zoom Lenses designed For 4K UHD Broadcast Cameras.

In July 2020, Canon recorded its first ever quarterly loss due to the COVID-19 pandemic.

In September 2020, Fujitsu announced that it would provide Canon with a Fujitsu Supercomputer PRIMEHPC FX1000 unit, to assist with its no-prototype development manufacturing initiative.

In December 2020, Canon concluded its photographic-equipment print-ad series named "Wildlife as Canon Sees It".  This series of ads began in 1981 in National Geographic magazine.

Products

Canon's products include cameras (including compact digital camera, video camera, film SLR and digital SLR), camcorders, lenses, broadcasting equipment and solutions (such as free viewpoint solution), professional displays, projectors, manufacturing equipment (including photolitography equipment such as steppers, scanners), printers, photocopiers, image scanners, digital microfilm scanners,  fax machines, binoculars, microscopes, medical equipment (including diagnostic systems such as ultrasound, X-ray, CT and MRI scanners and ophthalmic equipment), CCTV solutions, image sensors, calculators, high precision positioning and measurement devices (such as rotary encoders), custom optical components, handy terminals, mixed reality systems, software, and space satellites.

Digital cameras 

Canon has been manufacturing and distributing digital cameras since 1984, starting with the RC-701. The RC series was followed by the PowerShot and Digital IXUS series of digital cameras. Canon also developed the EOS series of digital single-lens reflex cameras (DSLR) which includes high-end professional models.

Due to consumers switching from compact cameras to smartphones, Canon's Q1 2013 operating profit fell 34 percent year-on-year.

Flash units 

Canon produces a range of high-output flash units for its DSLR cameras, including the 270EX II, 320EX, 430EX II, 430EX III-RT, 470EX-AI, 580EX, 580EX II, 600EX-RT, 600EXII-RT, EL-1, and EL-5 Speedlites. Canon also produces macro flash units, including the Macro Twin Lite and the Macro Ring Lite.

Camcorders

CMOS Image sensor 
Canon designs and manufactures CMOS image sensors in-house for its imaging products and it has three dedicated fabs in Japan. In 2016, Canon, the fifth-largest image sensor manufacturer in the world, decided to start selling the sensors to other companies. However, it does not plan to sell smartphone image sensors to focus on the niche markets such as industrial and space observation.

Although Canon had withdrawn from the so-called 'pixel count race' in the 2000s, it has been on the cutting edge as to the image sensor resolution in recent years. A demo of a 250MP image sensor was revealed in 2015 and reported to be launched in 2020. In 2018, Canon launched a 120MP image sensor as a part of its latest BtoB offerings.

Printers 
For many years, Canon was the principal maker of the print engines found in industry-standard laser printers. The first models of Apple LaserWriter and the equivalent products made by HP used the Canon LBP-CX engine. The next models (LaserWriter II series, LaserJet II series) used the Canon LBP-SX engine. Later models used the Canon LBP-LX, LBP-EX, LBP-PX engines and many other Canon print engines.

Following Canon's acquisition of the Dutch digital printing manufacturer Océ in 2010, Canon continued to develop and manufacture printing systems, initially under the Océ brand name. On 1.1.2020 the company Océ was officially renamed Canon Production Printing.

Digital copiers 
Canon's largest division in terms of revenue is its multifunction copier division. Canon distributes its consumer and home office imageCLASS line though retail outlets and professional-grade imageRUNNER series through subsidiary Canon Solutions America and independent distributors. The professional-grade series ranges from small table tops to large digital presses.

Scanners 
Canon manufactures a wide range of flatbed scanners, film scanners and document scanners for home and business use, including the Canon Canoscan 8800F. Some of its scanners employs LED inDirect Exposure (LiDE) technology, such that USB port is sufficient to power the scanner, and no additional power is required.

Current printers use the proprietary BJNP protocol (USB over IP port 8611).

Calculators 
Canon produced a range of calculators in various applications, including handheld calculators, desktop calculators, printing calculators and scientific calculators. One model was the 1964 Canola 130. It had 13 digits, a result of marketing research. The reason for the odd number of figures was based on selling it to the Japanese central bank. Given the low value of the Japanese Yen, 13 digits was a requirement of the banks.

The calculator was built by germanium transistors and the display was a light pipe which gave an odd format.

Projectors 
Canon produces a range of projectors.

Presenters 
Canon offers a range of wireless presenters, from advanced green laser presenters with back-lit screen display to basic red laser presentation clickers.

Virtual reality headset 
Canon is developing a prototype virtual reality headset (Canon VR). The headset offers a wider viewing angle (120°) than other VR devices but requires handles rather than a head strap. The headset is not yet available on the market. As of 2020, Canon produces and sells high-end AR (augmented reality) headsets for enterprise users.

Manufacturing equipment
Canon is one of the world's top producers of semiconductor and display manufacturing equipment. Its subsidiary Canon Tokki dominates the market of material deposition equipment, instruments for manufacturing OLED displays. Canon is also the leading manufacturer of display photolithography equipment and one of the top 3 in the semiconductor lithography machine market. Once a leader of semiconductor lithography along with Nikon, it has been dwarfed by ASML and as of 2017 its share in the overall market was less than 5%. Still, Canon maintains a great presence in the i-line stepper market.

Discontinued products

Computers 

Canon introduced two MSX home computer models in 1983, the V-10 and the V-20. Both offered just the minimum range of the MSX standards without any additional features. The V-20 was able to receive shooting data from the T90 Canon camera with the Data Memory Back T90 expansion.

Canon also sold a Canon AS100 PC for which you could get a color or monochrome display computer, shortly before the release of the IBM PC. It was based on the Intel 8088 processor and used CP/M or MS-DOS. Options included an 8 MB hard drive.

Operations 
As of 2020, Canon is organised into four principal business segments:
 the Office Business Unit (the products of which include copying machines, digital production printers, large format inkjet printers, laser printers and multi-function devices);
 the Imaging System Business Unit (the products of which include broadcasting equipment, calculators, compact digital cameras, digital SLR cameras, digital video camcorders, image scanners, interchangeable lenses, inkjet multifunction printers and single function inkjet printers);
 the Medical System Business Unit (the products of which include a broad range of medical equipment, such as ophthalmic equipment, CT, ultrasound scanners, and MRI); and,
 the Industry and Others Business Unit (the products of which include computers, handy terminals, magnetic heads, micromotors, flat panel display lithography equipment, semiconductor lithography equipment, and network cameras).
Canon Inc. has 383 subsidiaries as of 31 June 2017. The number includes second-generation subsidiaries, for example, Canon IT Solutions Inc.

Canon's world headquarters is located at 30-2 Shimomaruko 3-chome, Ota-ku, Tokyo 146–8501, Japan. Canon has regional headquarters in America, Europe, Middle East, Africa, Japan, Asia and Oceania (including Australia & New Zealand). Canon Europe has two principal subsidiaries: Canon Europa NV (based in Amstelveen, Netherlands) and Canon Europe Ltd. (based in Uxbridge, UK).

On 26 December 2003, Canon Inc. announced restructuring plans for three domestic Canon Group companies. The restructuring involved the merger of two companies and the spinning off of one.

Canon generated total revenues of US$45,608 million in 2011, of which 53.9% was by the Office Business Unit, 36.9% by the Consumer Business Unit and 11.8% by the Industry and Others Business Unit. In the same year, 31.3% of revenues were generated in Europe, 27.0% in the Americas, 22.2% in Asia and Oceania (excl. Japan) and 19.5% in Japan.

Canon invested a total of US$3,946 million in research and development in 2011, equivalent to 8.7% of sales. In 2011, Canon was granted 2,813 patents in the United States, the third-highest number of any company (after IBM and Samsung Electronics).

Environmental record
A report by the environmental organization Clean Air-Cool Planet puts Canon at the top of a list of 56 companies the survey conducted on climate-friendly companies.

Canon has also launched three new calculators in Europe, called "Green Calculators", which are produced in part from recycled Canon copiers.

The Canon Group has an environmental charter which looks at "offering products with a lower environmental burden through improvements in resource efficiency, while eliminating anti-social activities that threaten the health and safety of mankind and the environment". In 2020, Canon joined WIPO GREEN as an official partner in an effort to address climate change.

Charitable activities 
In 2008, Canon donated financial support to help the estimated 5 million people displaced by the earthquake that hit China's Sichuan province in May 2008. RMB 1 million was donated to the Red Cross Society of China shortly after the earthquake. Canon Inc., Japan, soon followed with a donation of RMB 10 million.

Sponsorships 

In 1983, Canon came as the first title sponsors of the English football league The Football League, which was named The Canon League from 1983 to 1986, when the sponsorship was taken over by the Today newspaper. From 1967 to 2003 Canon sponsored the Greater Hartford Open, now Travelers Championship.

In Formula One, Canon sponsored Williams between 1985 and 1993, while they won World Drivers Championships for Nelson Piquet (1987), Nigel Mansell (1992) and Alain Prost (1993) and Four World Constructors Championships (1986, 1987, 1992, 1993). In the 2009 Singapore Grand Prix, Canon sponsored Brawn GP.

Between 1994 and 1997 they also sponsored the South Sydney Rabbitohs.

Since 2006, Canon has been helping the Red Cross provide support to 13 Red Cross National Societies across Europe, with focus on youth projects. Support from Canon includes financial contributions and donations of imaging equipment, including cameras, copying machines and digital radiography devices, as well as volunteer activities.

Canon Europe has been a partner of World Press Photo for 16 years. World Press Photo promotes the professional standards in photography; organises the largest international contest for professional photojournalists; and acts as a worldwide platform for press photography.

Canon Asia sponsored many competitions such as Canon Photomarathon and reality TV show Photo Face-Off. The latter is a reality TV show in which professional photographer Justin Mott is the judge and competes against amateur photographers. Justin started filming season 3 in April 2016 and that season aired at the end of that same year.

See also

 Canon Open
 Nikon

Notes

References

External links

 
 

 
Japanese companies established in 1937
1940s initial public offerings
Belgian Royal Warrant holders
Companies listed on the Tokyo Stock Exchange
Companies listed on the New York Stock Exchange
Computer printer companies
Defense companies of Japan
Electronic calculator companies
Electronics companies established in 1937
Electronics companies of Japan
Equipment semiconductor companies
Fuyo Group
Japanese brands
Lens manufacturers
Multinational companies headquartered in Japan
Optics manufacturing companies
Photography companies of Japan